The Piura hemispingus (Sphenopsis piurae) is a species of bird in the family Thraupidae. It is found in  Ecuador and Peru. Its natural habitats are subtropical or tropical moist montane forests and heavily degraded former forest.

References

Piura hemispingus
Piura hemispingus
Piura hemispingus